San Antonio de los Buenos is a borough of the municipality of Tijuana in Baja California, Mexico.
San Antonio de los Buenos borough lies southwest of the city center and Sánchez Taboada boroughs and east of Playas de Tijuana. Blvd. de los Fundadores and Periférico are major thoroughfares.
Monte San Antonio lies in this borough and it's the highest part of Tijuana, so high that most TV and Radio anthennas for the largest broadcasting networks in Mexico have installations there as well as some US ones.
Boroughs of Tijuana